Call of Duty Championship 2016 was a Call of Duty: Black Ops III on PlayStation 4 tournament that occurred on September 1–4, 2016.

It was won by Team EnVyUs with a team consisting of Austin "SlasheR" Liddicoat, Bryan "Apathy" Zhelyazkov, Johnathon "John" Perez, and Jordan "JKap" Kaplan.

The tournament was livestreamed online on Twitch.

Format
Group Stage
Best of 5 Series
Top 2 advance to Knockout Stage
Bottom 2 teams are eliminated
Knockout Stage
Double Elimination
Best of 5 Series
Grand Finals
Team coming from the Losers Bracket must win two Best of 5 Series to claim victory.

Game Types and Maps
Included maps and modes:
Hardpoint: Breach, Evac, Fringe, Stronghold
Search and Destroy: Breach, Evac, Fringe, Hunted, Infection, Redwood, Stronghold
Uplink: Breach, Evac, Fringe, Infection
Capture the Flag: Breach, Evac, Fringe, Stronghold

Qualified teams

32 teams from the North America, Europe and APAC regions will qualify for the tournament. 12 teams will qualify via total points gained from each stages playoffs of their individual regions in the 2016 Call of Duty Pro League. Another 20 teams will qualify via online qualifiers from each region.

Pro League Teams
The 12 teams which accumulated the most points from their individual regions 2016 Call of Duty Pro League playoffs were the first teams to qualify for the 2016 Call of Duty Championship.

Online Qualifier teams
20 further teams qualified from their respective regions online qualifiers.

^ Flags represent the nationality of the majority of players on a team's active roster, not the country in which the organization is based.

Groups

Final standings

References

External links

2016 in Los Angeles
2016 in sports in California
Call of Duty Championship, 2016
Call of Duty Championship
Major League Gaming competitions